ASUB Rugby Waterloo is a Belgian rugby union club currently competing in the Belgian Elite League.

The club is based in Waterloo in the Walloon Brabant province of Belgium.
The official colours of the club are a combition of dark and marine blue.

History
The club was founded in 1959 and has won the Belgian Elite League title on 15 occasions most recently in 2013 and have won the Belgian Cup twelve times. Along with Boitsfort RC they have dominated Rugby Union in Belgium but have not managed to match their previous successes over the last decade. ASUB were runners up in the Elite League playoffs in four consecutive seasons between 2004–05 and 2007-2008 on each occasion to Boitsfort RC

In the 2011/12 season they finished the regular season in fifth place.

Honours
 Belgian Elite League
 Champions: 1963, 1965, 1968, 1969, 1978, 1979, 1980, 1984, 1986, 1987, 1988, 1989, 1994, 1998, 2013
 Belgian Cup
 Champions: 1968, 1979, 1984, 1985, 1986, 1987, 1988, 1991, 1992, 1994, 2001, 2009
 Belgian Super Cup
 Champions: 2009, 2014, 2015, 2016

Season by Season

See also
 Rugby union in Belgium
 Belgian Elite League
 Belgian Cup (Rugby Union)

External links
 Official site

Belgian rugby union clubs
Waterloo, Belgium